Kabatia is a genus of fungi belonging to the family Dothioraceae.

The genus was first described by František Bubák.

The generic name Kabatia honours Josef Emanuel Kabát (1849–1925) Czech botanist (Lichenology and Mycology).

The species of this genus are found in Europe and Northern America.

Species
Kabatia cucubali 
Kabatia fragariae 
Kabatia latemarensis 
Kabatia lonicerae 
Kabatia mirabilis 
Kabatia naviculispora 
Kabatia periclymeni 
Kabatia persica 
Kabatia silenes 
Kabatia valpellinensis

References

Dothideales
Dothideomycetes genera
Taxa described in 1904